Pavlychko is a Ukrainian surname. Notable persons with that name include:

Dmytro Pavlychko (1929–2023), Ukrainian poet, translator, scriptwriter, and culturologist
Solomiia Pavlychko (1958–1999), Ukrainian literary critic, philosopher, and translator

See also
 

Ukrainian-language surnames